Wuzhi railway station is a station on Zhengzhou–Jiaozuo intercity railway in Wuzhi County, Jiaozuo, Henan, China.

References

Railway stations in Henan
Stations on the Zhengzhou–Jiaozuo intercity railway
Railway stations in China opened in 2015